"Not Counting You" is a song written and recorded by American country music artist Garth Brooks.  It was released in January 1990 as the third single from his album Garth Brooks.  It peaked at #2 in the United States, while it was a number-one in Canada.  According to "The Garth Brooks Story" T.V. special, this was the first song Garth Brooks ever recorded.

Content
The song is an up-tempo song accompanied largely by fiddles. The song's narrator tells his ex-lover that not counting her, no woman has ever made him so blue, nor made him feel bad in any way.

Track listing
7" Jukebox single
Liberty B-44492, 1990
"Not Counting You"
"Cowboy Bill"
7" promotional single
Liberty P-B-44492, 1990
"Not Counting You"
"Not Counting You"

Chart positions
"Not Counting You" debuted the country charts on January 20, 1990 and peaked at number 2 on April 7 of that year.

Year-end charts

References

1990 singles
Garth Brooks songs
Songs written by Garth Brooks
Song recordings produced by Allen Reynolds
Capitol Records singles
1989 songs
Capitol Records Nashville singles